Hydrobia glyca is a species of very small aquatic snail, an operculate gastropod mollusk in the family Hydrobiidae.

Description

Distribution

References

Hydrobiidae
Hydrobia
Gastropods described in 1880